Rockfield is a small village in the community of Whitecastle, Monmouthshire, Southeast Wales. Rockfield Studios is situated just south of the village.

Placename 
The use of the English name, Rockfield, is first documented in 1566. However, it is believed that the name dates back to the 11th century, being derived from the French, Rocheville. The pre-Norman name for the settlement was Llanoronwy, and the Welsh Academy dictionary still gives the Welsh language name for the village as Llanoronwy Carn Cenhedlon. There was some controversy late in 2010, when Monmouthshire County Council reintroduced the Welsh name on local signage. The name was removed from the signs in 2011 after complaints from villagers.

Church of St Cenedlon

The village church is dedicated to an early Welsh saint, Cenedlon, who may have been the wife of Arthfael ab Ithel, king of Gwent in the 7th century.  Some old sources show it as being also dedicated to Saint Kenelm, a 9th-century Mercian martyr.  However, the Welsh name Llanoronwy appears to derive from a third name, Goronwy.

The church tower is mediaeval, but the rest of the church was rebuilt and refitted in 1859–60 by John Prichard and John Pollard Seddon in the Early English and Perpendicular styles.  It contains a painted coat of arms of William III, dated 1700.

It also contains, beneath the altar, the grave of Bishop Matthew Pritchard, the Catholic Vicar Apostolic of the Western District between 1713 and 1744.  In retirement, he lived with a Catholic family in a mediaeval mansion, Perthîr, beside the river; the house was demolished around 1830.

Other notable buildings
Several buildings in and around the village were constructed as part of the Rolls estate.   One of the entrance lodges to the family home at The Hendre,  to the west, is sited immediately north of the village.  Almshouses, provided in 1906 by Lord Llangattock for retired estate workers, are located beside the main road south of the village.  They were designed by Aston Webb and built in local Old Red Sandstone with half-timbering.  To the north of the village, Pentwyn is a house designed and occupied from 1837 by the Monmouth architect George Vaughan Maddox, and later extended as a parsonage.

Politics
The village falls under the community of Llangattock-Vibon-Avel and the constituency of Monmouth.

Gallery

References

Villages in Monmouthshire